Sam Jones or Sammy Jones may refer to:

Entertainment
 Sam J. Jones (born 1954), American actor, played Flash Gordon
 Sam Jones III (born 1983), American actor who played Pete Ross on Smallville
 Sam Jones (musician) (1924–1981), American jazz bassist, cellist, and composer
 Sam Jones (photographer), Los Angeles-based photographer, director, and TV show host

Fictional
 Sam Jones (Doctor Who), character in Doctor Who spin-off novels
 Sam Jones (Dynasty), character in the 2017 Dynasty TV series reboot
 Sam Jones (Mayberry R.F.D.), character on The Andy Griffith Show and Mayberry R.F.D.
 Samantha Jones (Sex and the City), character on Sex and the City and The Carrie Diaries

Politics
 Sam H. Jones (1897–1978), governor of Louisiana
 Sam Jones (Alabama politician) (born 1947), Alabama state representative since 2018; mayor of Mobile, Alabama 2005–2013
 Sam Jones (Australian politician) (1923–1999), Member for Waratah, New South Wales, 1965–1984
 Sam Jones (Louisiana politician) (born 1953), Louisiana state representative for St. Mary Parish since 2008

Sports

Association football
 Sam Jones (footballer, born 1991), English footballer
 Sam Jones (Welsh footballer), Welsh footballer
 Sammy Jones (footballer) (1911–1993), Irish footballer

Other sports
 Sam Jones (American football) (born 1996), American football offensive lineman
 Sam Jones (Australian footballer) (born 1974), Australian rules footballer
 Sad Sam Jones (1892–1966), American baseball player
 Sam Jones (baseball) (1925–1971), American baseball player known as "Toothpick Sam"
 Sam Jones (basketball, born 1933) (1933–2021), American basketball player in the NBA, inducted into Basketball Hall of Fame
 Sam Jones (basketball, born 1978), American basketball player and coach
 Sammy Jones (1861–1951), Australian cricketer
 Sam Jones (drag racer), American drag racer
 Sam Jones (rugby union) (born 1991), English rugby union footballer
 Sam Jones (ice hockey)  (born 1997),  English ice hockey player

Others
 Ar-pi-uck-i (1760–1860), known as Sam Jones, Seminole Native American chief
 Sam Jones (Confederate Army officer) (1819–1887), Civil War Confederate Major General

See also
 Samuel Jones (disambiguation)
 Samantha Jones (disambiguation)